Nonchalant is an American rapper. 
"Nonchalant" may also refer to

 "Nonchalant" (6lack song)
 "Nonchalant" (A Boogie wit da Hoodie song)
 "Nonchalant" (Gucci Mane song)